Niceto Alcalá-Zamora y Torres (6 July 1877 – 18 February 1949) was a Spanish lawyer and politician who served, briefly, as the first prime minister of the Second Spanish Republic, and then—from 1931 to 1936—as its president.

Early life
Alcalá-Zamora was born on 6 July 1877 in Priego de Cordoba, son of Manuel Alcalá-Zamora y Caracuel and Francisca Torres y del Castillo. His mother died when Niceto was three years old.

A lawyer by profession, from a very young age, he was active in the Liberal Party. Chosen as a deputy, he quickly gained fame for his eloquent interventions in the Congress of Deputies, becoming Minister of Public Works in 1917 and of War in 1922, and it comprised part of the governments of concentration presided over by García Prieto. He was also Spain's representative in the League of Nations.

Second Republic

Disappointed by the acceptance on the part of King Alfonso XIII of the coup d'état by General Miguel Primo de Rivera on 13 September 1923, Alcalá-Zamora did not collaborate with the new regime. After the departure of the dictator in 1930, he declared himself a republican in a meeting that took place on 13 April in the Apolo Theatre of Valencia. He was one of the instigators of the Pact of San Sebastián. The failure of the military uprising (Revolt of Jaca) in Aragon the same year sent him to prison, as a member of the revolutionary committee, but he left jail after the municipal elections of 12 April 1931. In the elections, although the monarchist candidates won more overall votes than the republicans did, the republicans did so well in the provincial cities that Alfonso soon abandoned power. Without waiting for a fresh election, Alcalá Zamora put himself at the head of a revolutionary provisional government, becoming the 122nd Prime Minister, which occupied the ministries in Madrid on 14 April and proclaimed the Second Spanish Republic.

Confirmed as Prime Minister in June, he resigned on 15 October, along with Miguel Maura, the minister of the interior. Both men opposed the writing of Articles 24 and 26 of the new Constitution, which consecrated the separation of church and state and allowed the dissolution of the religious orders that were considered dangerous by the state. Alcalá-Zamora and Maura said that the articles injured their religious feelings as well as those of the Catholic electorates that they represented.

Nevertheless, on 10 December 1931, Alcalá-Zamora was elected president by 362 votes out of the 410 deputies present (the Chamber was composed of 446 deputies).

In 1933, he dissolved the Cortes (parliament), which cost Alcalá-Zamora critical support on the part of the left. The subsequent elections of November 1933 gave victory to the right to which Alcalá-Zamora was very hostile, with constant institutional confrontations throughout its term in office. The party with the highest number of votes was the Confederación Española de Derechas Autónomas (CEDA), but it did not have enough seats to govern on its own. Alcalá-Zamora refused to appoint the CEDA leader José María Gil-Robles as prime minister and instead appointed Alejandro Lerroux, who then cooperated with the CEDA. In October 1934, Gil-Robles obtained two ministerial portfolios for CEDA; the following March, he acquired three more but at first stopped short of trying to obtain the office of Prime Minister. In the end, he decided to try for that post. Alcala-Zamora dissolved the Cortes on 7 January 1936, specifically to avoid that outcome.

The dissolution triggered new elections to the Cortes. The left-wing Popular Front won a narrow majority. The Left majority in the new Cortes then applied a constitutional loophole to oust Alcala-Zamora. The Constitution allowed the Cortes to remove the president from office after two early dissolutions, and while the first (1933) dissolution had been partially justified because of the fulfillment of the constitutional mission of the first legislature, the second one had been a simple bid to trigger early elections. Deeming such action "unjustified", the newly elected Cortes dismissed the President on 7 April 1936 and elected Manuel Azaña to the position. Azaña was detested by the right, and Zamora's removal was a watershed moment since many Spaniards gave up on parliamentary politics.

Final years and death
The beginning of the Spanish Civil War surprised Alcalá-Zamora, who was then on a trip to Scandinavia. He decided to stay away from Spain when he found out that militiamen of the Popular Front government had illegally entered his home, stolen his belongings and plundered his safe-deposit box in the Madrid Crédit Lyonnais bank, taking the manuscript of his memoirs.

When World War II began, Alcalá-Zamora was in France. The German occupation and the collaborationist attitude of the Vichy government made him leave France and go to Argentina in January 1942. There, he lived on money derived from his books, articles and conferences. An offer was allegedly made to him that he would be left unmolested if he returned since one of his sons was married to a daughter of General Gonzalo Queipo de Llano, one of the leaders of the uprising. If the offer ever occurred, it came to naught because he did not want to return to Spain under Franco.

Alcalá-Zamora died in Buenos Aires in 1949. His body was returned to Spain in 1979 and was interred in Madrid's Cementerio de la Almudena.

Marriage and family

He was married to María de la Purificación Castillo Bidaburu, and had children: 
 Niceto Alcalá-Zamora y Castillo (1906–1985), married to Ernestina Queipo de Llano y Martí, the daughter of Gonzalo Queipo de Llano y Sierra (Tordesillas, 5 February 1875 – Sevilla, 9 March 1951), 1st Marquess of Queipo de Llano, and wife (m. 4 October 1901) Genoveva Martí y Tovar, and had issue:
 José Alcalá-Zamora y Queipo de Llano, married to Aurora Horfelina Fernández y Mier (1 October 1942 – 29 May 2008), daughter of Vicente Isidro Fernández y Bascarán (14 February 1909 – 23 December 2003), 1st Viscount of San Claudio and 1st Lord of Olvera, of the Dukes of Castellón de la Plana and first cousin once removed of Cristóbal Martínez-Bordiú, Brigadier General of the Spanish Army, and wife María Marcela Mier y López, and had issue:
 Gonzalo Alcalá-Zamora y Fernández-Mier
 Lucía Alcalá-Zamora y Fernández-Mier

See also
Marcelino Valentín Gamazo

References

Bibliography 
 

1877 births
1949 deaths
People from Subbética
Liberal Party (Spain, 1880) politicians
Liberal Republican Right politicians
Presidents of Spain
Prime Ministers of Spain
Government ministers of Spain
Members of the Congress of Deputies of the Spanish Restoration
Members of the Congress of Deputies of the Second Spanish Republic
Permanent Representatives of Spain to the League of Nations
20th-century Spanish lawyers
Exiled Spanish politicians
Exiles of the Spanish Civil War in France
Second Spanish Republic
Burials at Cementerio de la Almudena
Exiles of the Spanish Civil War in Argentina
Madrid city councillors